Alien Breed is a series of top-down science fiction shoot 'em up video games developed by Team17 primarily for the Amiga in the 1990s, heavily inspired by the Alien films and featuring game play reminiscent of the classic arcade game Gauntlet. Later, first-person shooter titles were released under the Alien Breed name. In 2009, the series was revived with Alien Breed Evolution.

List of Alien Breed games

First era 
 Alien Breed (1991)
 Alien Breed Special Edition '92 (1992)
 Alien Breed II: The Horror Continues (1993)
 Alien Breed: Tower Assault (1994)
 Alien Breed 3D (1995)
 Alien Breed 3D II: The Killing Grounds (1996)

Second era 
 Alien Breed Evolution (2009)
 Alien Breed: Impact (2010)
 Alien Breed 2: Assault (2010)
 Alien Breed 3: Descent (2010)

References 

Alien Breed
Video game franchises introduced in 1991
Science fiction video games